Speocarcinus is a genus of crabs in the family Xanthidae, containing six extant species, one fossil species from the Late Miocene, one fossil species from the Eocene (Lutetian) and one fossil species from the Early Eocene (Ypresian):

Speocarcinus carolinensis Stimpson, 1859
Speocarcinus granulimanus Rathbun, 1894
Speocarcinus lobatus Guinot, 1969
Speocarcinus meloi D'Incao & Gomes da Silva, 1992
Speocarcinus monotuberculatus Falder & Rabalais, 1986
Speocarcinus spinicarpus Guinot, 1969
† Speocarcinus berglundi Tucker et al., 1994
† Speocarcinus tuberculatus  (Beschin, De Angeli, Checchi & Zarantonello, 2005); originally described as a species of Paraxanthosia, transferred to the genus Speocarcinus by Beschin et al. (2012)
† Speocarcinus latus Beschin et al., 2016

References

Xanthoidea
Extant Ypresian first appearances